The Dano-Hanseatic War from 1426–1435 (as was the Kalmar War with the Hanseatic League) was an armed trade conflict between the Danish-dominated Kalmar Union (Denmark, Norway, Sweden) and the German Hanseatic League (Hansa) led by the Free City of Lübeck.

When Danish king Eric opened the Baltic trade routes for Dutch ships and introduced a new toll for all foreign ships passing the Øresund (Sound Dues), six Hanseatic cities (Hamburg, Lübeck, Lüneburg, Rostock, Stralsund, Wismar) declared war, put a naval blockade on Scandinavian harbours and allied with Eric's enemy Henry IV, count of Holstein. Therefore the war was intensively linked with the Dutch–Hanseatic War (1422/38–1441), the Kalmar War with Holstein (1409/22–1435) and the Swedish revolt (1434–1436).

After years of changing fortune in warfare Rostock and Stralsund signed a separate peace agreement in 1430. Lübeck, Hamburg, Wismar and Lüneburg, however, continued the war and assisted Holstein to conquer Flensburg in 1431. Thereafter they agreed an armistice in 1432 and started peace negotiations. Meanwhile an anti-Danish revolt broke out in Sweden (Engelbrekt rebellion). In 1434 Eric had to agree an armistice with the Swedes, too. In April 1435 he signed the peace of Vordingborg with the Hanseatic League and Holstein, followed by the peace of Stockholm with Sweden a few months later the same year. The Hanseatic cities were excepted from the Sound Dues but they had to accept Dutch competition in the Baltic trade. The Danish Duchy of Schleswig was ceded to the count of Holstein. Sweden's autonomous rights and privileges were extended. These peace agreements weakened Eric's position dramatically, and in 1439 he got dethroned by Danish, Swedish and Norwegian Privy Councils.

Timeline
1426 - Danish troops reconquer Flensburg (Sleswig) which was occupied by Holstein before
1427 - Hanseatic plunder of Bornholm
1427 - failed Holstein-Hanseatic attack against Flensburg
1427 - Danish and Swedish naval forces defeat a Hanseatic fleet in the Øresund
1428 - two Hanseatic attacks against the joint Danish-Swedish fleet in Copenhagen
1428 and 1429 - Bergen (Norway) plundered by those Victual Brothers who allied with Holstein and Hansa
1429 - failed Danish-Swedish naval operation against Stralsund
1429 - Hanseatic capture of a Swedish transport fleet
1430 - peace between Denmark, Rostock and Stralsund
1431 - Holstein-Hanseatic troops conquer Flensburg
1432 - armistice between Denmark and the Hanseatic League
1434 - begin of the Swedish revolt, armistice between Denmark and Sweden
1435 - peace of Vordingborg, peace of Stockholm

References

Sources
David Nicolle: Forces of the Hanseatic League, 13th-15th Centuries, page 40f. Osprey Publishing 2014
George Childs Kohn (Hrsg.): Dictionary of Wars, page 254f. Routledge 2013
Franklin Daniel Scott: Sweden, the Nation's History, page 89ff. SIU Press, 1988

External links

European-heritage.org: The Chronicle of the Hanseatic League
Encyclopædia Britannica online: The Kalmar Union

Wars involving Denmark
Wars involving Sweden
Wars involving Norway
15th-century conflicts
History of Lübeck
Wars involving the Hanseatic League
1420s in Denmark
1430s in Denmark
15th century in Norway
15th century in Sweden
1420s in the Holy Roman Empire
1430s in the Holy Roman Empire
1420s conflicts
1430s conflicts

no:Krigen om Slesvig